The Joffre class consisted of a pair of aircraft carriers ordered by the  (French Navy) prior to World War II. The Navy had commissioned an experimental carrier in 1927, but it was slow and obsolete by the mid-1930s. Support for naval aviation in the navy was weak during this time as it had lost control of its aircraft, its training and their development to the new Air Ministry when it formed in 1928 and did not regain full control until 1936. Traditionalists among the naval leadership had begun a battleship building program in the early 1930s to counter German ships that were suitable for commerce raiding and carriers were deemed useful to hunt them down, especially once the Germans began building a carrier of their own in 1936.

One ship was laid down in 1938, but was not launched before all work was cancelled after the Armistice of 22 June 1940. The incomplete hull of Joffre was subsequently scrapped.

Background
The  ordered the conversion of the incomplete   into an aircraft carrier in 1922 to gain experience with carrier aviation. The following year the Naval General Staff requested another carrier similar to Béarn, but this was rejected as too expensive and plans were made for a cheaper aircraft transport that eventually became the seaplane carrier .

With the Navy only controlling the aircraft aboard its ships, the development of naval aviation stagnated as it was generally ignored by the ministry and no new carrier aircraft were developed in 1928–1932. The  was able to gradually reduce the ministry's control between 1931 and 1934 until it regained full control in August 1936. By this time the  had embarked on a building program for  fast battleships to counter possible German commerce raiders in the North Atlantic that the  Béarn was simply too slow to support. The Navy believed that carrier operations within range of hostile land-based aircraft were not viable given the limited size of their air groups and the commerce protection mission was ideal for its carriers. Design studies for a carrier able to operate with the new ships began in 1934, but two ships were not authorized until 1937, possibly in response to the laying down of the carrier  by Nazi Germany in 1936.

Description
Their crew numbered 70 officers and 1,180 sailors.

The  based the propulsion machinery of the Joffres on that used in the light cruiser , albeit with eight Indret water-tube boilers rather than four. The carriers retained the unit system of machinery with each boiler room supplying steam to the engine room aft of it so that one hit could not completely immobilize the ships. The boiler uptakes were trunked into a single funnel integrated into the island on the starboard side of the flight deck.

Aviation facilities
The ships'  flight deck was offset to the left from the centerline. The carriers were intended to be fitted with an aircraft-handling crane near the stern, below the flight deck that were strong enough to lift a seaplane aboard.

The  optimized the design of the Joffre class for "double-ended" operations, where aircraft could land and take off over both the bow and stern, so that battle damage to the flight deck would not necessarily end flight operations. Like Béarn, the Joffres had their arresting gear amidships, abreast the island, although the number of wires was increased to nine. While the amidships position minimized the ships' pitching in high seas, the air turbulence generated by the island was at its worst amidships. Based on trials aboard Béarn in 1935, collapsible landing signals were positioned on the centerline of the flight deck amid the arresting wires, facing in both directions. The flight deck was not provided with any crash barriers, so the American practice of keeping aircraft on the deck during landing operations was not possible. 

The two hydraulically powered elevators that transferred aircraft between the flight deck and the upper hangar were positioned at the ends of the flight deck, allowing aircraft landing amidships to taxi forward to the elevators and rapidly clear the flight deck. Both elevators were configured to be used by aircraft with their wings still spread, eliminating the requirement to fold the wings before using the elevators that slowed down Béarns flight operations. The rear elevator was outside the hangar and only its forward end reached the flight deck. Although it only measured , its position allowed it to strike down aircraft regardless of size.

A single fire curtain amidships could be used to divide the hangar. It was the only one that could be used for aircraft operations as the lower hangars were dedicated to workshops and aircraft assembly and storage facilities. A  elevator at the forward end of this hangar allowed aircraft to be transferred between the hangars. This elevator was offset to starboard to allow for a passageway to the lower hangar annex that measured . This annex, presumably dedicated to spare parts, was offset to port to make room for the boiler uptakes and ventilation ducting of the forward engine and fire rooms.

This required multi-role aircraft, able to switch between missions as the tactical situation dictated. The Joffre-class carriers were designed with an air group of 40 aircraft, 15 single-engined fighters and 25 twin-engined aircraft capable of long-range reconnaissance, bombing and torpedo attacks. In 1939 the Navy ordered 120 Dewoitine D.790 fighters, a navalized variant of the Dewoitine D.520, although no aircraft was completed before the Armistice cancelled further work. It issued the A47 specification in 1937 for attack aircraft to equip the carriers and ordered two prototypes each of the SNCAO CAO.600 and the Dewoitine D.750 in 1939. The  issued the updated A80 specification that same year for a faster aircraft and selected the Bréguet Bre.810, a navalized version of the Bréguet Bre.693, but the prototype was not completed before the Armistice.

Armament, fire control and armor
The carriers' primary armament consisted of eight 45-caliber Canon de  Mle 1932 dual-purpose guns in four twin-gun turrets positioned fore and aft of the island in superfiring pairs. Their mounts had a maximum elevation of +75° and the guns had a rate of fire of about 10 rounds per minute.

Light anti-aircraft defense was provided by eight 48-caliber Canon de  Mle 1935 guns in four twin-gun ACAD mounts on the island, and twenty-eight Hotchkiss Mitrailleuse de  Mle 1929 machine guns in seven quadruple mounts. There were two mounts on the forecastle, two on the stern and a pair on the island. The remaining mount was on the port side underneath the flight deck overhang. The 37 mm guns were fully automatic and had a theoretical rate of fire of 165 rounds per minute. Their mounts had an elevation range of -10° to +85°.

The 130 mm guns were controlled by a pair of superimposed directors on the top of a short tower on the roof of the island. The upper director was equipped with a  rangefinder for anti-aircraft defense and the lower with a  one for surface engagements. Each of the upper 130 mm turrets was fitted with a rotating 5-meter rangefinder as a backup to the directors. A director equipped with a  rangefinder remotely controlled each ACAD mount. The two forward directors were superimposed on the roof of the island while the two after directors were side-by-side aft of the director tower.

The waterline armor belt of the Joffre-class ships covered the middle  of the hull, from the forward magazines to the aft aviation gasoline tank. It formed an armored citadel with  transverse bulkheads at its ends. The armored deck was 70 mm thick over the magazines and gasoline tanks, but reduced to  amidships over the machinery compartments. The  torpedo belt ranged in thickness from  abreast the propulsion machinery spaces, but thinned to  abreast the magazines. The steering compartment was fitted with 26-millimeter armor plates. For protection against fire, the aviation gasoline tanks were surrounded by either empty compartments with fire-resistant insulation or inert gases on all sides.

Ships 
The beginning of World War II less than a year after Joffre was laid down led to a slow down of construction as resources were diverted to higher-priority tasks and the ultimate cessation of work that came in June 1940 when the country capitulated after the German invasion when the ship was approximately 20% complete. Work on Joffre was not continued by the Germans and the hull was scrapped. The second planned vessel of the class, Painlevé, was never laid down because it was supposed to succeed Joffre on Slipway No. 1. A third ship was intended to be authorized in 1940 to replace Béarn, but the order was never placed. 

The  demonstrated no sense of urgency in building Joffre as the bulk of the naval leadership felt completing the two s to match the modern German and Italian battleships was more important. This was further demonstrated when the first ship of the s was authorized on 1 April 1940 and replaced Painlevé in the queue for Slipway No. 1. This belief was not unreasonable as the Germans had suspended work on Graf Zeppelin and the British had an ample number of carriers that could perform the trade protection mission in the North Atlantic.

References

Bibliography

Further reading

External links
 3D renderings
 3D renderings

Aircraft carrier classes
 
Proposed aircraft carriers
Cancelled aircraft carriers
Ship classes of the French Navy